Egon Andersen (30 December 1910 – 6 May 2001) was a Danish footballer. He played in four matches for the Denmark national football team in 1936.

References

External links
 

1910 births
2001 deaths
Danish men's footballers
Denmark international footballers
Association football defenders
Kjøbenhavns Boldklub players